BSMFC may refer to one of the following English football clubs:

 Boldmere St. Michaels F.C.
 Bugbrooke St Michaels F.C.